New York City's 51st City Council district is one of 51 districts in the New York City Council. It has been represented by Republican Joe Borelli since a 2015 special election to replace fellow Republican Vincent Ignizio.

The district holds a number of distinctions. It is by far the most Republican-leaning Council district in the city; it is the only Council district to have more registered Republicans than Democrats; and, at 84% white, it is the city's whitest and most politically conservative Council district.

Geography
District 51 covers the South Shore of Staten Island, including the neighborhoods of Great Kills, Tottenville, Annadale, Huguenot, Rossville, Pleasant Plains, Eltingville, Bay Terrace, Charleston, Prince's Bay, Richmond Valley, Woodrow, Arden Heights, Greenridge, and parts of Heartland Village and New Springville.

The district includes a large number of parks, among them Great Kills Park, Blue Heron Park, Wolfe's Pond Park, Long Pond Park, Conference House Park, Bloomingdale Park, Clay Pit Ponds State Park Preserve, and the southern parts of Freshkills Park and the Staten Island Greenbelt.

The district overlaps with Staten Island Community Boards 2 and 3, and is contained entirely within New York's 11th congressional district. It also overlaps with the 24th district of the New York State Senate, and with the 62nd, 63rd, and 64th districts of the New York State Assembly.

Recent election results

2021

In 2019, voters in New York City approved Ballot Question 1, which implemented ranked-choice voting in all local primary and special elections. Under the new system, voters have the option to rank up to five candidates for every local office. Voters whose first-choice candidates fare poorly will have their votes redistributed to other candidates in their ranking until one candidate surpasses the 50 percent threshold. If one candidate surpasses 50 percent in first-choice votes, then ranked-choice tabulations will not occur.
}}

2017

2015 special
In 2015, Councilman Vincent Ignizio resigned his seat to take a job in the nonprofit sector, leaving his seat vacant. A special election was called to fill his seat; like most municipal special elections in New York City, the election was officially nonpartisan, with candidates running on ballot lines of their own creation.

2013

Previous Councilmembers
 Alfred Cerullo (created 1992–1994)
 Vito Fossella (1994–1997)
 Stephen Fiala (1998–2001)
 Andrew Lanza (2002–2006)
 Vincent Ignizio (2007–2015)
 Joe Borelli (2015–present)

References

New York City Council districts